Isakiyevsky is a rural locality (a khutor) in Poklonovskoye Rural Settlement, Alexeyevsky District, Volgograd Oblast, Russia. The population was 271 as of 2010.

Geography 
Isakiyevsky is located 29 km north of Alexeyevskaya (the district's administrative centre) by road. Martynovsky is the nearest rural locality.

References 

Rural localities in Alexeyevsky District, Volgograd Oblast